This article lists the songs and artists that have won Melodi Grand Prix, the Norwegian national selection for the Eurovision Song Contest. The competition was not held in 1970 (non-participation), 1991 (NRK’s cancellation) and 2002 (relegation).

List of winners

See also
Melodi Grand Prix
Norway in the Eurovision Song Contest

Notes

 
W
Melodi Grand Prix winners